Girona FC Femení A, referred to by the club as Senior A, is a football team from Girona, the women's section of Girona FC. Three seasons after reviving their women's section, Girona bought the women's section of Sant Pere Pescador and renamed them.

History
Although Girona FC operated a senior women's team for a number of years, financial constraints had forced them to resign to its place in Segunda División in 2013 and to cease operations in 2016. Girona FC Femení returned to competition in 2017–18, in the second division of the Catalan regional leagues, the fifth tier of women's football in Spain.

Three seasons later, the club purchased the women's section of local club Sant Pere Pescador, renaming the senior team to Girona FC Senior A. The existing team was renamed Girona FC Senior B.

Season to season

References

External links
Girona FC Femení on the Catalan Football Federation website

Women's football clubs in Spain
Association football clubs established in 2020
Football clubs in Catalonia
2020 establishments in Spain
Girona FC